William Tunberg may refer to:

William Tunberg (artist) (born 1936), American sculptor
William Tunberg (screenwriter), American screenwriter